Merenhor may have been an Eighth Dynasty king of ancient Egypt during the First Intermediate Period. His name is only attested on the Abydos King List (n. 46).

References

VIIth Dynasty 2175 - 2165, Accessed November 9, 2006.
Abydos King List, Accessed November 9, 2006.

22nd-century BC Pharaohs
Pharaohs of the Eighth Dynasty of Egypt